"Next Year" is a 2000 song by the Foo Fighters.

Next Year may also refer to:

 "Next Year" (Two Door Cinema Club song), 2013
 Next Year, a 1953 drama series published by Kraft Television Theatre
 "Next Year", a 2021 song by Macklemore featuring Windser
 "Next Year", a 1969 song by Paul Anka

See also
 
 Last Year (disambiguation)